Saraiya is a block in Manikpur village Muzaffarpur district, Bihar state ,a village in Gorakhpur, Uttar Pradesh, and in Bharatpur, Rajasthan, India.

References

Villages in Gorakhpur district